The South African national cricket team toured New Zealand in February and March 1999 and played a three-match Test series against the New Zealand national cricket team. South Africa won the series 1–0. New Zealand were captained by Dion Nash and South Africa by Hansie Cronje. In addition, the teams played a six-match series of Limited Overs Internationals (LOI) which South Africa won 3–2.

One Day Internationals (ODIs)

1st ODI

2nd ODI

3rd ODI

4th ODI

Replay

5th ODI

6th ODI

Replay

Test series summary

1st Test

2nd Test

3rd Test

References

External links

1999 in South African cricket
1999 in New Zealand cricket
International cricket competitions from 1997–98 to 2000
New Zealand cricket seasons from 1970–71 to 1999–2000
1999